Kadaksham is a 2010 Malayalam film by Sasi Paravoor starring Suresh Gopi, Shwetha Menon and Shwetha Vijay.

Plot 
Kadaksham movie is a women oriented movie which states the story of how women has to survive against all odds even now in the society which still has a contemporary outlook.

Cast 
 Shwetha Vijay
 Suresh Gopi
 Shweta Menon
 Vijaya Raghavan
 Jagathy Sreekumar
 Indrans
 Manasa Radhakrishnan Malu(child artist)
Jijoy Rajagopal
 Sreedhanya as Nirmala

Soundtrack
"Prananathan" - K. S. Chithra
"Omanapennallayo" - Sharreth
"Parayathevayya" - M. Jayachandra
"Khalchowdvi" - Fiaz Khan

References

External links 

 Nowrunning.com
 Cinecurry.com
 Popcorn.oneindia.in

2010 films
2010s Malayalam-language films
Films scored by M. Jayachandran
2010 action films
Indian action films